Marchex, Inc. is a Seattle-based public company, founded in 2003, with more than 300 employees. Marchex is a B2B (business-to-business) call and conversational analytics company. It specializes in using artificial intelligence and machine learning to analyze conversation data between businesses and customers. Marchex provides businesses “actionable insights” to improve customer experiences over the phone, SMS, messaging, and chat.

History

In October 2000, an internet-based company named Go2Net Inc. merged with another company, InfoSpace Inc. A $1.5 billion deal facilitated the formation of Marchex, a startup company whose founders were all former Go2Net executives. John Keister, Ethan Caldwell, and Peter Christothoulou were part of the Go2Net team that founded Marchex, led by a fourth member, Go2Net's founder, Russell Horowitz. In January 2003, the four formed Marchex, Inc. Each member of the founding team assumed executive responsibilities at the new start-up.

Marchex’s IPO was filed in December 2003 and has made several acquisitions since its founding.

In February 2015, Horowitz stepped down as CEO while remaining active on the board of directors. Christothoulou was announced as Horowitz’s replacement.

Marchex and many of its known subsidiaries (Archeodomains) employed domain name parking (CyberSquatting) as a self-proclaimed "backward" business model that held over 200,000 domains hostage from businesses, registered trademark holders, and individuals.  In April 2015, Internet domain name registrar and web hosting company GoDaddy acquired 200,000 of Marchex's cybersquatted domains for $28.1 million in cash, intending to make domains that have "not been generally available to the public" and "available to businesses worldwide."

In October 2016, both CEO Pete Christothoulou and Board Chairman Clark Kokich resigned from the company. The company is now led by an "interim office of the CEO" headed up by Anne Devereux-Mills, a Marchex board member since 2006.

In January 2023, Marchex announced it had signed deals with over 300 Automobile dealers to its AI Conversation intelligence Cloud Platform in the last year. The service was aimed to aid auto dealers sales teams and buying experiences.

Board of directors

As of October 2019, the members of the board of directors at Marchex are:

Russell Horowitz – Executive Chairman of the Board of Directors
Dennis Cline – Director
Donald P. Cogsville – Director
M. Wayne Wisehart – Director

Awards Won

2018: APPEALIE Best SaaS Award
2015: CIO 50 Most Promising Google Technology Solution Providers
2008: Search Engine Strategies Best SEM Technology Platform for SMBs

References

2004 initial public offerings
Companies based in Seattle
Companies established in 2003